Gunnar Wingqvist (7 May 1885 – 30 December 1918) was a Swedish diver. He competed in the men's 10 metre platform event at the 1908 Summer Olympics.

References

External links
 

1885 births
1918 deaths
Swedish male divers
Olympic divers of Sweden
Divers at the 1908 Summer Olympics
Sportspeople from Norrköping
20th-century Swedish people